Brian Elliott (born April 9, 1985) is a Canadian professional ice hockey goaltender for the Tampa Bay Lightning of the National Hockey League (NHL). He was drafted by the Ottawa Senators in the ninth round, 291st overall, of the 2003 NHL Entry Draft. A two-time NHL All-Star in 2012 and 2015, Elliott has also played in the NHL for the Senators, Colorado Avalanche, St. Louis Blues, Philadelphia Flyers and Calgary Flames.

Playing career

Junior
Elliott grew up in Newmarket, Ontario, playing minor hockey for the Newmarket Redmen AA and the York-Simcoe Express AAA teams in the Ontario Minor Hockey Association. Elliott was not drafted by an Ontario Hockey League (OHL) team in 2001 and returned to York-Simcoe for Major Midget the following season. After a solid season in the Eastern AAA Hockey League, Elliott was signed by the Ajax Axemen of the Ontario Provincial Junior A Hockey League in 2002–03.

NCAA
After a standout season with the Ajax Axemen in 2002–03, Elliott was drafted in the ninth round, 291st overall, in the 2003 NHL Entry Draft by the Ottawa Senators. The second-last player selected in the draft, Elliott was not expected to progress to the NHL. After being drafted, he would spend four seasons with the University of Wisconsin–Madison, serving as a backup for his first two seasons before securing the starting goaltender position in the 2005–06 season. For his efforts, he was selected as a finalist for the 2005–06 Hobey Baker Memorial Award, collecting eight shutouts in 33 appearances, and leading the Badgers to the 2006 NCAA National Championship. He was then signed by the American Hockey League (AHL)'s Binghamton Senators – an affiliate of the Ottawa Senators – on March 23, 2007, and played in eight games with Binghamton near the end of the 2006–07 season.

Professional

Ottawa Senators

Elliott was invited to the Ottawa Senators' 2007–08 training camp, but was ultimately assigned to Binghamton on September 25, 2007. He was recalled to Ottawa four days later to back up Martin Gerber, as starting goaltender Ray Emery was recovering from wrist surgery. On October 10, Elliott played in his first NHL game and earned the win against the Atlanta Thrashers. Upon Emery's return, Elliott was sent back to Binghamton, where he played in 44 games that season.

On January 9, 2009, Elliott was recalled by Ottawa after being named the AHL's Goalie of the Month for December. He had been a standout in Binghamton, posting an 18–8–1 record with a 2.31 goals against average (GAA) and .926 save percentage. His play earned him the starting position for the Canadian team in the 2009 AHL All-Star Game.

Elliott made an immediate impact in Ottawa. The team had struggled all season, with inconsistent goaltending being an issue. Craig Hartsburg, Ottawa's head coach at the time, said of the move, "We need some saves, some big saves, and he's done it down there [in Binghamton]." Elliott would finish the season in Ottawa, sharing goaltending duties with veteran Alex Auld. Elliott's emergence effectively made Martin Gerber expendable to the team, and he would later be claimed on waivers by the Toronto Maple Leafs.

Elliott was nominated for the NHL's Rookie of the Month award for March 2009, though he would lose out to St. Louis Blues forward T. J. Oshie. In January 2010, he was awarded the NHL's First Star of the Week for January 18–24, and named the League's Second Star of the Week for January 25–31.

Colorado Avalanche
Prior to the trade deadline of the 2010–11 season, Elliott was traded as a part of Ottawa's rebuilding process to the Colorado Avalanche on February 18, 2011, in exchange for goaltender Craig Anderson.

After winning just two of his 12 starts with the Avalanche, combined with a sub-par 3.83 GAA, Elliott was released as a free agent after Colorado declined his qualifying offer.

St. Louis Blues

Elliott signed a one-year contract worth $600,000 with the St. Louis Blues on July 1, 2011. Forming a formidable goaltending tandem with Jaroslav Halák, Elliott revitalized his career, posting a 23–10–4 record while sporting a 1.56 GAA. He was also chosen to participate in the 2012 NHL All-Star Game in Ottawa.

On January 18, 2012, Elliott signed a two-year contract extension with the Blues. The deal carried an average annual value of $1.8 million. Elliott reportedly earned $1.7 million in 2012–13 and $1.9 million in 2013–14. After taking over for the injured Halák during the first round of the 2012 Stanley Cup playoffs, Elliott led the Blues to a series victory over the San Jose Sharks before ultimately being swept in round two by the eventual Stanley Cup champions, the Los Angeles Kings.

On May 19, 2014, Elliott signed a three-year contract extension to remain in St. Louis. The deal has an average annual value of $2.5 million. On January 22, 2015, Elliott was named to the 2015 NHL All-Star Game in Columbus, replacing Columbus Blue Jackets' goaltender Sergei Bobrovsky, who pulled out due to injury.

On March 12, 2015, Elliott tied Jaroslav Halák for the Blues' franchise record in shutouts. Five days later, on March 17, Elliott surpassed Halák for the Blues' shutout franchise record.

A 23–8–6 record during the 2015–16 NHL season earned Elliott the starting role for the Blues for the 2016 Stanley Cup playoffs. He led the Blues to a first round victory over the defending Stanley Cup champion Chicago Blackhawks. He made 31 saves in the deciding Game 7 victory on April 25. Elliott and the Blues would then move on to face the Western Conference's top overall team, the Dallas Stars. Again, the Blues prevailed in seven games. Elliott's only faltering occurred in Game 6 of the series, when he was pulled in favor of Jake Allen after allowing three goals on seven shots. He rebounded the next game, making 31 saves in a decisive 6–1 victory that propelled St. Louis to the Western Conference Finals for the first time since 2001 where they lost to the San Jose Sharks. started in all but two games in the playoffs (games 4 and 5 of the Western Conference Finals).

Calgary Flames
During the 2016 NHL Entry Draft, Elliott was traded by the Blues to the Calgary Flames in exchange for a 2016 second-round pick (Jordan Kyrou) and a 2018 conditional third-round pick on June 24, 2016. On October 24, 2016, he won his first game as a Flame against Chicago in a shootout. However, he struggled with the team early, prompting them to switch to Chad Johnson as the team's regular starter. Elliott regained the starting job after starting the season off 3–9–1 with a 3.31 GAA and a save percentage of .885. On June 17, 2017, GM Brad Treliving informed Elliott that he will not be returning to the team for the 2017–18 season.

Philadelphia Flyers
On July 1, 2017, Elliott officially signed a two-year, $5.5 million contract with the Philadelphia Flyers. During the 2017–18 season, Elliott was named the third star of the week for the week of December 17 after he helped the Flyers earn six consecutive wins following a losing streak of 10 games. Despite missing a few months due to injury, the Flyers qualified for the 2018 Stanley Cup playoffs. Elliott was replaced during their series against the Pittsburgh Penguins and the Flyers lost in the first round 4 games to 2.

On June 26, 2019, Elliott re-signed with the Flyers, signing a one-year contract worth $2 million.

On October 3, 2020, the Flyers re-signed Elliott to a one-year contract extension worth $1.5 million.

On May 4, 2021, Elliott played his 500th game in the NHL, the 77th goaltender to do so.

Tampa Bay Lightning
On July 28, 2021, Elliott was signed as a free agent to a one-year, $900,000 contract with the Tampa Bay Lightning.

The Lightning placed Elliott and Andrei Vasilevskiy, their two regular goalies, into the NHL Covid protocol on December 26, 2021. Elliott was the first one eligible to exit the Covid-protocol on December 31. He played that night against the New York Rangers, his third start of the season. He allowed 3 goals on 23 shots, and the game eventually went into a shootout. Elliott gave up the only goal in the shootout to Mika Zibanejad, which was enough to earn New York a 4–3 win.

Personal life
While attending Newmarket High School, he took the school's boys hockey team to the championship, winning it in 2000. He also attended Newmarket High School with former Blues teammate B. J. Crombeen.

Elliott's father, Bill, is a television director who has worked on numerous Canadian television programs, including The Red Green Show. He resides in Wisconsin during the off-season. Elliott has one brother named Dan.

Elliott was taught the art of moose calling by the late Owen Scott, a champion moose caller. He paid tribute to Scott with a moose painted on the back of his goaltender mask. Due to this, his nickname among teammates is "Moose." Elliott also had Casey Jones from Teenage Mutant Ninja Turtles painted on his mask.

During the 2015–16 NHL season, Elliott began wearing all blue pads as a tribute to former Blues goaltender Curtis Joseph, and also had his mask painted with the same design that Joseph wore.

Elliott's wife, Amanda, enrolled in the University of Wisconsin's Reserve Officers' Training Corps (ROTC) before commissioning as an intelligence officer in the United States Air Force. Their first child, Owen, was born on October 2, 2016.

Career statistics

Awards and achievements

References

External links

 

1985 births
Living people
Binghamton Senators players
Calgary Flames players
Canadian ice hockey goaltenders
Colorado Avalanche players
Ice hockey people from Ontario
Lehigh Valley Phantoms players
National Hockey League All-Stars
Ottawa Senators draft picks
Ottawa Senators players
Peoria Rivermen (AHL) players
Philadelphia Flyers players
St. Louis Blues players
Sportspeople from Newmarket, Ontario
William M. Jennings Trophy winners
Wisconsin Badgers men's ice hockey players
AHCA Division I men's ice hockey All-Americans